J. Eric Hammill (born 25 August 1932) is a farmer and former politician on Prince Edward Island. He represented Borden-Kinkora in the Legislative Assembly of Prince Edward Island from 1996 to 2003 as a Progressive Conservative.

He was born in Lower Freetown, Prince Edward Island. He purchased the family farm in 1954 and, in 1955, married Helen McIsaac. Hammill was president of the Kinkora Dairy Cooperative, Atlantic representative on the National Farm Products Marketing Council for nine years and Secretary-Manager for the Prince Edward Island Federation of Agriculture for twelve years. He served in the provincial cabinet as Minister of Agriculture and Forestry and Minister responsible for the P.E.I. Grain Elevators Corporation. Hammill lives in Kinkora.

References 

Progressive Conservative Party of Prince Edward Island MLAs
1932 births
Living people
People from Kinkora, Prince Edward Island
Members of the Executive Council of Prince Edward Island
21st-century Canadian politicians